Goodnight Vienna is a 1974 album by Ringo Starr.

Goodnight Vienna may also refer to:

Goodnight, Vienna, a 1932 British musical film
Goodnight Vienna, radio operetta and song on which the film is based, by Eric Maschwitz and George Posford
"Goodnight, Vienna", several 1932 78rpm singles by Al Bowlly
"(It's All Down to) Goodnight Vienna", a song by John Lennon on Ringo Starr's album Goodnight Vienna
Goodnight Vienna Productions, the production company for Peter Kay's comedy output
"Vienna 92 (Goodnight Vienna remix)", a version of "Vienna" (Ultravox song)
"Goodnight Vienna", an episode of TV series Shine on Harvey Moon